Schrammel is a surname. Notable people with the surname include:

Johann Schrammel (1850–1893), Austrian composer and musician
Josef Schrammel (1852–1895), Austrian composer and musician
Roland Schrammel (born 1968), Austrian football player
Thomas Schrammel (born 1987), Austrian football player

See also 
Schrammel accordion
Schrammel guitar
Schrammelmusik